Team tennis is a tennis tournament which consist of matches between different groups of players each competing to win the tournament for their team. The format is usually an altered version of the professionally played World TeamTennis format; consisting of both Men's and Women's matches with Singles, Doubles and Mixed Doubles.

By country
It is played at the collegiate or national level in the United States. The United States Tennis Association promotes junior team tennis and USTA League Tennis. The National Collegiate Athletic Association organizes competitions such as the NCAA Division I Men's Tennis Championship and NCAA Division I Women's Tennis Championship. Many regions have their own "city-based" or "area-based" for example; the CASHS tennis team teams (often backed by a professional player) with a National Championship in the US.

In the United Kingdom, team tennis is played through schools and clubs from local to national levels. The Lawn Tennis Association have an 'AEGON Team Tennis Series' where several thousands of teams compete.

List of Adult team tennis tournaments
Active
Davis Cup – men's national teams
Fed Cup – women's national teams
ATP Cup – men's national teams
Laver Cup – men's Team Europe vs Team World
World TeamTennis – mixed North American franchises

Ceased
Hopman Cup – mixed national teams
International Premier Tennis League – mixed Asia-Pacific franchises
Champions Tennis League – mixed Indian franchises
Odisha Tennis Premier League – mixed Indian franchises

Abolished
Wightman Cup – women's United States vs Great Britain
World Team Cup – men's national teams

See also
World TeamTennis is a different organization and playing format; formulated by Billie Jean King

References

Forms of tennis